Pierre de Gondi, cardinal de Retz (1533–1616) was a French bishop and cardinal of the Gondi family.

Life
Born in Lyon, he was a brother of Albert de Gondi (two of whose sons, Henri and Jean-François, succeeded Pierre as bishop of Paris) and a protégé of Catherine de Médicis.  In turn, he became bishop of Langres (1565), bishop of Paris (1570), chancellor and grand almoner to Elisabeth of Austria, wife of Charles IX of France.

He was created cardinal in 1587.

Gondi undertook several missions to Rome under Henry III of France and Henry IV of France and attended the 1592 papal conclave.

References

Sources
 
House of Gondi on web.genealogie

1533 births
1616 deaths
Clergy from Lyon
17th-century French cardinals
Bishops of Paris
Bishops of Langres
16th-century peers of France
Burials at Notre-Dame de Paris